The Metro Atlantic Athletic Conference baseball tournament is the conference baseball championship of the NCAA Division I Metro Atlantic Athletic Conference.  The top four finishers in the regular season participate in the double-elimination tournament, which in 2014 was played at FirstEnergy Park in Lakewood, New Jersey. The winner of the tournament receives an automatic berth to the NCAA Division I Baseball Championship.

History
From 1982 to 1993, the Metro Atlantic Athletic Conference determined its champion by regular season records. From 1990 to 1993, the conference divided into divisions and crowned a champion of each division. The conference eliminated division in 1994 and launched the tournament to crown its conference champion.  In 2014, the tournament expanded from four teams to six teams.

Champions

By year
The following is a list of tournament champions by year.

Indicates declared champion, tournament final canceled due to inclement weather.

By school
The following is a list of tournament championships listed by school.

Italics indicate that the program no longer fields a baseball team in the Metro Atlantic Athletic Conference.

References